The East Coast Conference women's basketball tournament is the annual conference women's basketball championship tournament for the East Coast Conference. The tournament has been held annually since 1991. It is a single-elimination tournament and seeding is based on regular season records.

The winner receives the conference's automatic bid to the NCAA Division II Women's Basketball Championship.

Saint Rose, a former member of the ECC, have the most tournament titles, with six.

Results

Championship records

D'Youville, Mercy, and Staten Island have not yet qualified for the ECC tournament finals.
Concordia (NY), NJIT, and Southampton College never qualified for the ECC tournament finals as conference members.
 Schools highlighted in yellow have temporarily suspended their athletics programs.
 Schools highlighted in pink are former members of the East Coast Conference.

See also
 East Coast Conference men's basketball tournament

References

NCAA Division II women's basketball conference tournaments
Tournament
Recurring sporting events established in 1991